Executive Order 12086 was signed by President Jimmy Carter on October 5, 1978, in order to provide for the transfer to the Department of Labor of certain contract compliance functions relating to equal employment opportunity.

External links

Executive Order 12086 from the U.S. National Archives and Records Administration website.

References

1978 in law
1978 in the United States
History of civil rights in the United States
Executive orders of Jimmy Carter
History of affirmative action in the United States